Jane Walsh was an English textile worker and writer. She was born c. 1905 in the slums of Oldham northern England. Walsh lived through the hard times of depression, mass unemployment, and suffering of '20 and '30. Her husband Charlie worked as well in the textile industry. She was left a widow at the age of 40, after many years of living with her husband and their three children, the youngest of whom was crippled by polio.

Though being a classic representative of the working class, Walsh didn't manage to connect herself with the syndicalist movevement of that time, which were very active especially near Lancashire textile areas.

In 1953 her autobiography, Not Like This, was published.

Bibliography 
 Not Like This (1953), published by Lawrence & Wishart Ltd, London

References

Sources 
 News Statesman, 1953, review
 Blogcritics, review, 2011

English women non-fiction writers
1900s births
Year of death missing
Women autobiographers
English autobiographers